Michał Chyliński (born 22 February 1986) is a Polish professional basketball player for Czarni Słupsk of the Polish Basketball League. He has played for the Polish national basketball team on many occasions.

References

External links
 Michał Chyliński at eurocupbasketball.com
 Michał Chyliński at telekom-baskets-bonn.de
 

1986 births
Living people
Astoria Bydgoszcz players
Czarni Słupsk players
KK Włocławek players
Nanterre 92 players
Point guards
Polish expatriate basketball people
Polish men's basketball players
Shooting guards
Sportspeople from Bydgoszcz
Telekom Baskets Bonn players
Turów Zgorzelec players